Muhammad ibn Abd al-Aziz al-Dabbagh (Arabic: محمد بن عبد العزيز الدباغ) (1928-2008) was a Moroccan jurisprudent and writer.

His Early life 
Muhammad al-Dabbagh was born in Fes, Morocco where he was raised and studied. His origins go back to a family that was known in the city of Fes at the time.

Career path 
Muhammad bin Abdulaziz Al-Dabbagh authored a number of books throughout his career in the field of writing and publishing. Perhaps the most prominent publication was the book “One of the Flags of Thought and Literature in the Marinid Era,” a book in which Muhammad bin Abdulaziz dealt with the most famous and prominent scholars of thought, literature and others in the Marinid era.

This book was of special interest to translation and media researchers at the time of its publication and in the period in which it was circulated, as it falls within the scope of translation works and the related branches of social thought and culture, which was not well known at the time and was not covered extensively.

List of his works 
This is a list of the most prominent works of the Moroccan writer, and jurist, Muhammad bin Abdulaziz Al-Dabbagh.

 “One of the Flags of Thought and Literature in the Marinid Era,”

References 

Moroccan writers
Moroccan novelists
Moroccan Arabic
People from Fez, Morocco
1928 births
Living people